Labatt Brewing Company Limited is a Belgian-owned brewery headquartered in Toronto, Ontario, Canada. Founded in 1847, Labatt is the largest brewer in Canada.

In 1995, it was purchased by Belgian brewer Interbrew. In 2004, Interbrew merged with Brazilian brewer AmBev to form InBev. In 2008, InBev merged with American brewer Anheuser-Busch to form Anheuser-Busch InBev (abbreviated as AB InBev), making Labatt part of Anheuser-Busch InBev. On October 10, 2016, an over $100 billion merger between Anheuser-Busch InBev and SABMiller closed. Labatt is now part of the new company, Anheuser-Busch InBev SA/NV, which is trading as BUD on the New York Stock Exchange (ABI:BB in Brussels).

In the United States, Labatt brand beers are sold under license by Labatt USA, which since 2009 has been fully independent of the Canadian firm and a subsidiary of the privately held FIFCO USA of Rochester, New York.

History 

Labatt Breweries was founded by John Kinder Labatt in 1847 in London, Canada West (now Ontario). Kinder had immigrated to Canada from Ireland in the 1830s and initially established himself as a farmer near London. In 1847, he invested in a brewery with a partner, Samuel Eccles, launching "Labatt and Eccles". When Eccles retired in 1854, Labatt acquired his interest and renamed the firm the "London Brewery". He was assisted by his sons Ephraim, Robert and John.

When John Kinder Labatt died in 1866, his son John assumed control of the company. Under his supervision, it grew to be the largest brewery in Canada. Following his death in 1915, the company was controlled by a trust operated by his nine children, although his sons John Sackville Labatt and Hugh Francis Labatt assumed managerial control.

In 1901, Prohibition in Canada began through provincial legislation in Prince Edward Island. In 1916, prohibition was instituted in Ontario as well, affecting all 64 breweries in the province. Although some provinces totally banned alcohol manufacture, some permitted production for export to the United States. Labatt survived by producing full strength beer for export south of the border and by introducing two "temperance ales" with less than two per cent alcohol for sale in Ontario. However, the Canadian beer industry suffered a second blow when Prohibition in the United States began in 1919. When Prohibition was repealed in Ontario in 1926, just 15 breweries remained, and only Labatt retained its original management. This resulted in a strengthened industry position. In 1945, Labatt became a publicly traded company with the issuance of 900,000 shares.

John and Hugh Labatt, grandsons of founder John K. Labatt, launched Labatt 50 in 1950 to commemorate 50 years of partnership. The first light ale introduced in Canada, Labatt 50 was Canada's best-selling beer until 1979.

In 1951, Labatt launched its Pilsener Lager; when it was introduced in Manitoba, the beer was nicknamed "Blue" for the colour of its label and the company's support of Winnipeg's Canadian Football League (CFL) franchise, the Blue Bombers. The brew-master at the time was Robert Frank Lewarne (b. 1921 Toronto; R.F. Lewarne also headed the team that produced the famous Labatt 50, mainly for the Quebec market). The nickname "Blue" stuck and in 1979, Labatt Blue claimed the top spot in the Canadian beer market. It lost this status in the late eighties to Molson Canadian, but over the next decade, it periodically regained the top spot as consumer preferences fluctuated. In 2004, Budweiser took the top spot, pushing Blue to third for the first time in twenty-five years. However, since Labatt has brewed Budweiser (and other Anheuser-Busch products) in Canada under licence since the 1980s, Labatt likely did not suffer from this shift. Moreover, Labatt Blue remains the best selling Canadian beer in the world, based upon worldwide sales.

Labatt was also the majority owner of the Toronto Blue Jays from their inception in 1976 until 1995, when Interbrew purchased Labatt. In 2000, Rogers Communications purchased an 80% stake in the team and Interbrew retained the other 20%; Rogers later acquired full ownership of the team.

Labatt's innovations include the introduction of the first twist-off cap on a refillable bottle in 1984. In 1989, Labatt's had the opportunity to hire Canadian model Pamela Anderson as a Labatt's Blue Zone Girl after she was picked out of the crowd by a TV camera man at a BC Lions football game wearing a Blue Zone crop-top. Photographer and boyfriend Dann Ilicic produced the Blue Zone Girl poster on his own after Labatt's refused to have anything to do with it. Later, Labatt's did buy 1000 posters to deal with consumer demand.

In 1995, Labatt was acquired by the large Belgian multinational brewer Interbrew (now InBev), the world market leader. Labatt is part-owner of Brewers Retail Inc., operator of The Beer Store retail chain, which—protected by legislation—has over 90% market share of Ontario off-premises beer sales. In early 2007, Labatt also acquired Lakeport Brewing Company of Hamilton, Ontario.

In 2009, the company sold Labatt USA, including the American rights to its core Labatt products (such as Blue, Blue Light, and Labatt 50) to FIFCO USA, and agreed to brew those brands on Labatt USA's behalf until 2012. This sale was mandated by the U.S. Department of Justice for competitive reasons following InBev's merger with Anheuser-Busch, since Budweiser and Labatt Blue were both among the top brands in upstate New York, despite the latter having less than 1% market share in the U.S. overall.

The sale did not include U.S. rights to Labatt products not carrying the "Labatt" label, such as Kokanee or Alexander Keith's, which are now distributed in the U.S. by Anheuser-Busch. Moreover, the underlying intellectual property (such as the Labatt trademarks) remains the property of the Canadian firm. Finally, the sale did not affect Labatt's Canadian operations in any way, however Anheuser-Busch InBev retains full control of the Labatt brand portfolio within Canada.

In 2020, Labatt acquired Canadian distiller Goodridge & Williams, a company known for creating Nütrl Vodka Soda and other ready-to-drink (RTD) canned cocktails.

Operations
Canada
 London, Ontario
 St. John's, Newfoundland and Labrador
 Montreal, Quebec (in the LaSalle borough)
 Halifax, Nova Scotia
 Creston, British Columbia
 Edmonton, Alberta
United States (previous to sale)
 Buffalo, New York (Original and current United States Headquarters)
 Norwalk, Connecticut (One time US headquarters)

Labatt's US headquarters were originally located in Buffalo for some years. Labatt then decided to relocate their headquarters to Norwalk, Connecticut, for a time. In 2007 Labatt decided to relocate their US operations back to Buffalo due to strong sales in the city and closer proximity to their Ontario operations. Labatt USA is now owned by FIFCO USA of Rochester, New York.

Labatt's Toronto (Rexdale) brewery was built in 1970. It ceased operations in 2005 and was demolished by 2007, thus ending the brewery's ties to the city.

Brands

Labatt 50 is a 5% abv ale launched in 1950 to commemorate 50 years of partnership between the grandsons of the brewer's founder. The first light-tasting ale introduced in Canada, Labatt 50 was Canada's best-selling beer until 1979, when, with the increasing popularity of lagers, it was surpassed by Labatt Blue. Labatt 50 is fermented using a special ale yeast, in use at Labatt since 1933.

Labatt Blue is a 5% abv pale lager. There are 355 mL of beer in a standard can of Labatt Blue/Bleue in Canada with other volumes available in specific regions of the country.

In Quebec, Labatt also produces a stronger lager, Labatt Bleue Dry, at 6.1%.

Blue, the company's flagship brand, has entered a number of international beer ratings competitions and has always performed notably well. In 2003, Labatt Blue received a Gold Quality Award at the World Quality Selections, organized yearly by Monde Selection.

Labatt had patented a specific method for making ice beer in 1997, 1998 and 2000: "A process for chill-treating, which is exemplified by a process for preparing a fermented malt beverage wherein brewing materials are mashed with water and the resulting mash is heated and wort separated therefrom. The wort is boiled cooled and fermented and the beer is subjected to a finishing stage, which includes aging, to produce the final beverage. The improvement comprises subjecting the beer to a cold stage comprising rapidly cooling the beer to a temperature of about its freezing point in such a manner that ice crystals are formed therein in only minimal amounts. The resulting cooled beer is then mixed for a short period of time with a beer slurry containing ice crystals, without any appreciable collateral increase in the amount of ice crystals in the resulting mixture. Finally, the so-treated beer is extracted from the mixture." The company provides the following explanation about Labatt Ice and Maximum Ice for the layman: "During this unique process, the temperature is reduced until fine ice crystals form in the beer. Then using an exclusive process, the crystals are removed. The result is a full flavoured balanced beer."

Corporate activities 

Labatt has sponsored the construction of many buildings in London, including Labatt Park, the John Labatt Centre, and the John Labatt Visual Arts Centre at the University of Western Ontario (UWO). Bessie Labatt's son Arthur Labatt was the 19th chancellor of UWO (2004–2008). In 1998 Labatt announced a 20-year sponsorship agreement with the now defunct Montreal Expos (now the Washington Nationals), which included naming rights for a downtown Montreal ballpark that was never built.

They sponsored the English football team Nottingham Forest F.C. from 1992 (interchanging with Shipstones Brewery until 1994) to 1997.

They also are the official beer and corporate sponsor of the OHL hockey franchise Plymouth Whalers. In the 1950s, the company sponsored a PGA Tour golf tournament, the Labatt Open.

Labatt sponsored Gilles Villeneuve as well as being the main sponsor of the Formula One Canadian Grand Prix from 1972 to 1986, as well as Williams F1 racing team from 1991 to 1994.

In 1983–1986, Labatt sponsored Ken Westerfield, Canadian Frisbee champion and world record holder, to perform Frisbee shows throughout Ontario, as well as sponsor the World Guts (Frisbee) Championships on Toronto Islands in 1986.

Labatt sponsors the annual Labatt Blue Buffalo Pond Hockey Tournament at Buffalo RiverWorks. The outdoor amateur hockey tournament features more than 800 players.

In May 2009, Labatt gave their support to a seventh NHL team in Canada, which was pursued by Jim Balsillie.

In November 2018, Labatt USA opened Labatt Brew House, a  innovation brewery and tasting room in Buffalo, New York. Visitors may sample experimental beers or choose from a variety of established brews.

Marketing 
Labatt Blue is sold in all provinces of Canada; however, in Quebec it is sold under the French name Labatt Bleue, with a fleur-de-lis logo. Aside from the name, and containing 4.9% alcohol/volume instead of 5.0%, the red maple leaf on the logo has also been changed to a stylized red sheaf of wheat, which Labatt calls its symbol of "brewing quality."

Labatt Blue is sold in most of the United States, with sales particularly strong in the Midwest and Northeast along the Canada–United States border.

Honours

Coat of Arms 

In 2017, the Canadian Heraldic Authority granted arms, banner and badge to Labatt.

In media

See also 
 Beer in Canada
 The Beer Store, beer retailer in Ontario
 Brewers' Distributor, beer distributor in Western Canada
 Ice beer

References

External links 

 
 1970s Labatt's Beer Commercial - From the Internet Archive.
 Article on the streamliner trucks

Multimedia
 CBC Archives CBC Radio reports on Interbrew's takeover of Labatt (From 1995).

 
Beer brewing companies based in Ontario
LaSalle, Quebec
1847 establishments in Ontario
Toronto Blue Jays owners
InBev brands
Companies based in London, Ontario
Canadian subsidiaries of foreign companies
Food and drink companies established in 1847
Canadian companies established in 1847